James Price  (born November 20, 1959 in Copenhagen) is a Danish composer and conductor, as well as a celebrity chef.

See also
List of Danish composers

External links
Spise med price profile 

Danish composers
Male composers
1959 births
Living people
People from Copenhagen